Kajola is a Local Government Area in Oyo State, Nigeria. Its headquarters are in the town of Okeho.

Other major towns in Kajola LG are Ilero, Imia, Ilua, Ayetoro-oke, Isemi ile, Iwere-oke, and Ilaji-oke.

It has an area of 609 km and a population of 200,997 at the 2006 census.

The first Local Government chairman was Chief Michael Adegbite.

The postal code of the area is 202.

References

Local Government Areas in Oyo State
Local Government Areas in Yorubaland